Pleasant Ridge is an unincorporated community in Jay County, Indiana, in the United States.

The community was named from its scenic setting upon a drainage divide.

References

Unincorporated communities in Jay County, Indiana
Unincorporated communities in Indiana